Eugene Scalia (born August 14, 1963) is an American attorney who is a partner at Gibson Dunn. He served as the United States secretary of labor during the final 16 months of the Donald Trump administration. Scalia previously served one year as solicitor of the Department of Labor during the George W. Bush administration. He is a son of the late Supreme Court Associate Justice Antonin Scalia.

Scalia was described by The New York Times as "a skilled lawyer with a broadly conservative, pro-business and anti-regulatory agenda". During his tenure in the Department of Labor, he reversed Obama-era labor and employment regulations.

Early life and education 
Scalia was born on August 14, 1963, in Cleveland, Ohio, the second of nine children of Antonin Scalia and Maureen (née McCarthy) Scalia. He attended the University of Virginia, graduating in 1985 with a Bachelor of Arts with distinction in economics and a minor in political science. He worked for the U.S. government for two years, then attended the University of Chicago Law School, where he became editor-in-chief of the University of Chicago Law Review. He graduated in 1990 with a Juris Doctor, cum laude.

Career

From 1985 to 1987, he was an aide to United States Department of Education Secretary William J. Bennett. From 1992 to 1993, he served as Special Assistant to Attorney General William P. Barr. Scalia was in private practice in Washington, D.C., and Los Angeles, California. In 2000, his firm, Gibson Dunn, represented George W. Bush before the U.S. Supreme Court in Bush v. Gore.

He served as the Solicitor of Labor, having been appointed by President Bush in April 2001 and assuming the position in January 2002 following a recess appointment. At the time, he was accused by Democratic senators and labor groups of being hostile to workers and criticized for his articles criticizing ergonomics. A group of former career officials within the Department of Labor have since described Scalia as having been "very supportive of enforcement litigation to vindicate the rights of workers, both at the trial and appellate levels". In 2019, The New York Times wrote that Scalia "is perhaps best known for his opposition to a regulation that would have mandated greater protections for workers at risk of repetitive stress injuries". The regulation was repealed by Congress in 2001.

Private legal practice 
During his career in private practice, Scalia has defended major corporations against financial and labor regulations. Writing in The New Yorker, Eyal Press said "as a corporate lawyer, Scalia has repeatedly hindered the efforts of workers to secure benefits or defend their rights." After leaving the Bush administration, he helped Wall Street firms oppose financial oversight and criticized banking regulations put in place under Obama.

Scalia argued for the plaintiffs in Wal-Mart v. Maryland in July 2006, which invalidated a state law under which large companies with at least 10,000 employees would have been required to spend at least 8% of their payroll on employee healthcare.

Following his term as Secretary of Labor, Scalia returned to private practice at Gibson Dunn, where he is co-chair of the firm's administrative law and regulatory practice group.

U.S. Secretary of Labor 

On July 18, 2019, President Donald Trump announced he would nominate Scalia to be the next Secretary of Labor. On September 26, 2019, the Senate confirmed his nomination by a vote of 53–44. Scalia was sworn in by Vice President Mike Pence on September 30. Scalia is the only person to have served as both Solicitor and Secretary of Labor.

During his tenure in the Department of Labor, he weakened some labor and employment protections, drawing criticism from organized labor leaders.

Janet Herold, an Obama-era career appointee to the Labor Department, spearheaded a number of employment discrimination lawsuits against major technology companies, including the Oracle Corporation. In 2019, Herold filed a complaint in which she alleged that Scalia had abused his authority by intervening to settle a 2017 Labor Department lawsuit in which Oracle was being investigated for allegedly underpaying women and people of color. Scalia encouraged a settlement figure between $17 million and $38 million, which Herold considered too low. Oracle went on to win the case, with the Department of Labor deciding not to appeal the decision. The Department of Labor dismissed Herold's complaint against Scalia, saying that Herold's "retaliation allegations rest on erroneous speculation regarding matters she is not in a position to know" and that Scalia had not participated in settlement discussions with Oracle. Herold was fired by Scalia in January 2021 after refusing to accept a transfer to a non-legal position.

References

External links

 Eugene Scalia at Gibson Dunn
 

1963 births
Living people
20th-century American lawyers
21st-century American lawyers
American people of Italian descent
Lawyers from Cleveland
Lawyers from Washington, D.C.
Lawyers who have represented the United States government
People associated with Gibson Dunn
Trump administration cabinet members
United States Department of Labor officials
University of Chicago Law School alumni
United States Secretaries of Labor
University of Virginia alumni
Washington, D.C., Republicans
Wharton School of the University of Pennsylvania alumni